The Otto Brinkmann House in Comfort, Texas, United States, was built in 1861 by Otto Brinkmann.  It was designated a Recorded Texas Historic Landmark in 1976 and listed on the National Register of Historic Places in 1977.

It is a one-story two-room house of fachwerk construction. It is a German method of timber framing with diagonal bracing members at corners and openings. Timbers are joined by mortise and tenon joints. Timbers on its front facade are exposed. The house was modified in 1899 by addition of a framed lean-to along its rear facade.

It was built, and lived in, by German immigrant carpenter Otto Brinkman, who was born in Hoexter, Westphalia in 1932.  He completed an apprenticeship to a cabinet-maker in Germany before coming to the U.S. in 1852.

See also

National Register of Historic Places listings in Kendall County, Texas
Recorded Texas Historic Landmarks in Kendall County

References

External links

1861 establishments in Texas
Houses completed in 1861
Houses on the National Register of Historic Places in Texas
Buildings and structures in Kendall County, Texas
Recorded Texas Historic Landmarks
National Register of Historic Places in Kendall County, Texas
Historic district contributing properties in Texas